Michelangelo Frammartino (born 1968) is an Italian filmmaker.

Biography 
Michelangelo Frammartino was born in Milan to Calabrian parents in 1968. In 1991 he enrolled in the Architecture Faculty of the Politecnico di Milano. Between 1994 and 1997 he attended Milan's film school, Civica Scuola del Cinema, for which he produced videoart installations and worked as a set designer for films and video clips. He also shot several short films: Tracce (1995), L'Occhio e lo Spirito (1997), BIBIM (1999), Scappa Valentina (2001), Io Non Posso Entrare (2002).

His first feature Il Dono premiered at the Locarno Film Festival in 2003. His following film Le Quattro Volte (2010) was selected at the Director's Fortnight in Cannes, where it won the Label Europa Cinema.

Since 2005 he has been teaching filmmaking at the University of Bergamo. In December 2013 he held a workshop at the University of Calabria.

His 2021 film Il buco was selected for the main competition at the 78th Venice International Film Festival, where it received positive reviews and won the Special Jury Prize.

Filmography

Short films 
 Tracce (1995)
 L'Occhio e lo Spirito (1997)
 BIBIM (1999) – co-directed with Cafi Mohamud
 Scappa Valentina (2001)
 Io Non Posso Entrare (2002)

Feature films 
 Il Dono (2003)
 Le Quattro Volte (2010)
 Il buco (2021)

Installations 
 Presenze s-connesse (1995)
 Ora (1995)
 La Casa delle Belle Addormentate (1997)
 Film (1998)
 Alberi (2013)
 Sguardi in Macchina (2013)

References

External links 
 

1968 births
Living people
Italian documentary filmmakers
People of Calabrian descent